Khosravi or Khosrovi, also rendered as Khusrawi or Khesrawi or Khusravi or Khusrovi or Khosrowvi may refer to various places in Iran. It is also a family name from Iran.

Places
 Khosravi, Kermanshah, a village in Alvand Rural District, in the Central District of Qasr-e Shirin County, Kermanshah Province, Iran
 Khosravi, Khuzestan, a village in Mosharrahat Rural District, in the Central District of Ahvaz County, Khuzestan Province, Iran
 Khosravi, alternate name of Khosraviyeh, Khuzestan,  a village in Qaleh Chenan Rural District, in the Central District of Karun County, Khuzestan Province, Iran
 Khosravi, Nehbandan, a village in Arabkhaneh Rural District, Shusef District, Nehbandan County, South Khorasan Province, Iran
 Khosravi, Qaen, a village in Qaen Rural District, in the Central District of Qaen County, South Khorasan Province, Iran.

Related places 
 Arababad-e Khosravi, a village in Alborz, Iran
 Istgah-e Khosravi, a village in Khuzestan, Iran
 Kureh-ye Khosravi, a village in Kermanshah, Iran
 Siah Siah-ye Khosravi, a village in Kermanshah, Iran

People with the family name Khosravi 
 Amir Cheshme Khosravi (born 1998), Iranian footballer 
 Arghavan Khosravi (born 1984), Iranian-born American painter and sculptor
 Golnoosh Khosravi (born 2001), Iranian football player 
 Hamed Khosravi (born 1992), Iranian football player 
 Koueistan Khosravi (born 1985), Iranian football player 
 Mahafarid Amir Khosravi (1969–2011), Iranian businessperson who was executed 
 Meysam Khosravi (born 1983), Iranian football player 
 Mohammad Ali Khosravi (born 2001), Iranian taekwondoka 
 Ramin Khosravi (born 1984), Iranian football player
 Sirvan Khosravi (born 1982), Iranian singer, songwriter, and music producer 
 Xaniar Khosravi (born 1985), Iranian singer. composer, lyricist and music arranger 
 Gholamreza Khosravi Savadjani (1965–2014), Iranian political prisoner who was executed 
 Mahmoud Khosravi Vafa (born 1953), Iranian conservative politician 
 Nosratollah Khosravi-Roodsari, Iranian-American who was freed during a prisoner exchange 

Surnames of Iranian origin